Babuna may refer to:
Babuna (mountain), a mountain in North Macedonia
Babuna (river), a river in North Macedonia
FK Babuna, a football club in North Macedonia